This is a list of Canadian films which were released in 1994:

See also
 1994 in Canada
 1994 in Canadian television

External links
Feature Films Released In 1994 With Country of Origin Canada at IMDb

1994
1994 in Canadian cinema
Canada